Klemens Biniakowski (15 November 1902 – 6 March 1985) was a Polish sprinter. He competed in the men's 400 metres at the 1928 Summer Olympics.

References

1902 births
1985 deaths
Athletes (track and field) at the 1928 Summer Olympics
Athletes (track and field) at the 1936 Summer Olympics
Polish male sprinters
Olympic athletes of Poland
People from Nakło nad Notecią
People from the Province of Posen
Sportspeople from Kuyavian-Pomeranian Voivodeship
20th-century Polish people